Primo premio: Mariarosa, also known as Primo premio: Maria Rosa, is a 1952 Italian comedy film directed by Sergio Grieco and starring Carlo Croccolo.

Plot
The film is one of a series of light comedies directed by Grieco at a period in his career when he could not make serious films. Mariarosa, a cow, is the prize in an annual raffle held by a village in Abruzzo. One year the winner is a visitor who works in a government ministry in Rome, Virgilio (Croccolo), and he decides to keep the cow. Eventually he is persuaded to honour custom and return her to be raffled off again the following year; in the process he finds love.

Cast
 Carlo Croccolo
 Isa Barzizza
 Carlo Campanini
 Fulvia Franco
 Mirella Uberti
 Galeazzo Benti
 Leopoldo Valentini
 Carlo Romano
 Luigi Bonos

References

External links
 

1952 films
1950s Italian-language films
Italian comedy films
Films directed by Sergio Grieco
1952 comedy films
Italian black-and-white films
1950s Italian films